The fairy tree frog (Charadrahyla chaneque) is a species of frog in the family Hylidae endemic to Mexico. Its natural habitats are subtropical or tropical moist lowland forests, subtropical or tropical moist montane forests, and rivers. It is threatened by habitat loss.

Citations

General references 
 

Charadrahyla
Amphibians described in 1961
Taxonomy articles created by Polbot